Coniontini is a tribe of darkling beetles in the subfamily Pimeliinae of the family Tenebrionidae. There are at least 4 genera in Coniontini, found in North America.

Genera
These genera belong to the tribe Coniontini
 Coelus Eschscholtz, 1829 (dune beetles)
 Coniontis Eschscholtz, 1829
 Conisattus Casey, 1895
 Eusattus Leconte, 1851

References

Further reading

 
 

Tenebrionoidea